Origin is a digital distribution platform developed by Electronic Arts for purchasing and playing video games. In October 2022, Origin ceased operations for its Windows platform, directing players to EA app. The Mac and mobile versions remain online.

Origin contained social features such as profile management, networking with friends with chat and direct game joining along with an in-game overlay, streaming via Twitch and sharing of game library and community integration with networking sites like Facebook, Xbox Live, PlayStation Network, Nintendo Network, and Nintendo Account. In 2011, Electronic Arts stated that it wanted Origin to match Valve's Steam service, Origin's primary competitor, by adding cloud game saves, auto-patching, achievements, and cross-platform releases. By 2013, Origin had over 50 million registered users.

Components

Origin store

The Origin store allows users to browse and purchase games from Electronic Arts' catalogs. Instead of receiving a box, disc, or even CD key, purchased software is immediately attached to the user's Origin account and is to be downloaded with the corresponding Origin client.

Origin guarantees download availability forever after purchase, and there is no limit to the number of times a game can be downloaded.

Users may also add certain EA games to their Origin account by using CD keys from retail copies, and digital copies obtained from other digital distribution services. However, the addition of retail keys to Origin is restricted to games from 2009 onwards and older keys will not work even if the game is available on Origin, unless user contacts customer support.

Origin client
The Origin client is self-updating software that allows users to download games, expansion packs, content booster packs and patches from Electronic Arts. It shows the status of components available. The Origin client is designed to be similar to its competitor, Steam. The Origin In Game overlay client can be disabled while playing games. The client also features chat features such as a Friends List and a group chat options (implemented in version 9.3). Client and download performance has been patched and improved in past updates.

EA Play

EA released a subscription service for accessing and playing their games on PC in 2016 originally called EA Access; via the Origin client, this was called Origin Access. Users can choose between paying a monthly or yearly subscription fee to access a large collection of EA titles (known as The Vault). Origin Access subscribers also get a 10% discount on all Origin purchases. Starting in March 2018, Origin Access starting offering titles from Warner Bros. Interactive Entertainment and was looking to add other publishers' titles, including those from indie games.

At E3 2018 EA announced a premium tier for Origin Access called Origin Access Premier, that allows to play future EA games early, the games will be full version in contrast to the "First Trials" giving to basic Origin Access members. To streamline branding, EA renamed both EA Access and Origin Access both to EA Play, with the Origin Access Premier named to EA Play Pro.

In September 2020, EA announced it plans to retire Origin in favor for a new desktop client that will support the new EA Play and EA Play Pro subscriptions. It is expected all Origin content will carry over to the new EA Desktop client once it is fully released. The new client began its beta test in September 2020. The new client, named EA app was released on October 7, 2022, for Windows users with a deployed migration to existing users of Origin. The Origin client remains available for macOS users presently.

History
EA Downloader was launched in late 2005. It was replaced by EA Link in November 2006, adding trailers, demos and special content to the content delivery service. In September 2007, it was once again replaced by the combination of EA Store and EA Download Manager. Users purchase from the EA Store website and use the downloadable EADM client to download their games. Games bought via EA Link were downloadable using the EA Download Manager. The store and client was reopened under the Origin name on June 3, 2011.

The digital distribution software was first used to deliver the Battlefield 2: Special Forces expansion pack, and subsequently most EA titles. The biggest product launch on the software is Spore Creature Creator.

EA acquired the trademark Origin when it purchased Origin Systems in 1992. Origin Systems was a major game studio in the 1980s and 1990s, best known for its Ultima, Wing Commander, and Crusader game franchises.

Removal of Crysis 2 from Steam and Origin exclusives
Shortly after the launch of Origin, Crysis 2 was pulled from Steam and appeared on EA's website with an "only on Origin" claim, though it remained available on other distribution services. EA has since stated that Valve removed Crysis 2 due to imposed "business terms" and that "this was not an EA decision or the result of any action by EA."

Since then, Crysis 2: Maximum Edition (a re-release of Crysis 2 with all the DLCs) has been released on Steam, matching EA's story about pulling Crysis 2 due to DLC restraints. EA has confirmed that Battlefield 3 would not be available through Steam. The game is currently available for purchase on other non-Origin services such as GameFly, Green Man Gaming or GamersGate, but the Origin client must be used regardless of where the game was purchased. Starting from the release of Battlefield 3 in 2011 until November 2019, every first-party game EA published on PC was exclusive to the Origin service. In late 2019, EA began releasing their games on Steam again, starting with Star Wars Jedi: Fallen Order, however, the game still uses the Origin client to launch. EA started to release their existing games on Steam in June 2020.

Origin account bans
There have been several instances of EA enforcing such bans for what critics argue are comparatively minor infractions, such as making rude comments in EA or BioWare's official forums or in chat.

During March 2011, a user named "Arno" was banned for allegedly making the comment "Have you sold your souls to the EA devil?" Arno's account was banned for 72 hours which prevented him from playing any of his Origin games. After reporting on the details of the incident, website Rock, Paper, Shotgun received a statement from EA saying that Arno's account ban was a mistake, and that future violations on the forums would not interfere with Origin users' access to their games.

Later during October and November 2011, one user was banned for posting about teabagging dead players. Another user received a 72-hour account suspension for posting a link to his own network troubleshooting guide in the EA forums. EA interpreted this as a "commercial" link, even though the same link had been posted elsewhere in the forums, and EA's own corporate support site and FAQ. One user was permanently banned for submitting a forum post containing the portmanteau "e-peen," which is slang for "electronic penis."

Privacy and security

Security weaknesses
EA has been criticized for not encrypting Origin's XMPP chat functionality, which is available in Origin and in Origin powered games. Unencrypted data includes account numbers, session tokens, as well as the message contents itself. With this type of data, user accounts might get compromised.

Accusations of spying
Origin's end-user license agreement (EULA) gives EA permission to collect information about users' computers regardless of its relation to the Origin program itself, including "application usage (including but not limited to successful installation and/or removal), software, software usage and peripheral hardware." Initially, the EULA also contained a passage permitting EA to more explicitly monitor activity as well as to edit or remove material at their discretion. A report by the news magazine Der Spiegel covered the allegations. In response to the controversy, EA issued a statement claiming they "do not have access to information such as pictures, documents or personal data, which have nothing to do with the execution of the Origin program on the system of the player, neither will they be collected by us." EA also added a sentence to the EULA stating that they would not "use spyware or install spyware on users' machines," though users must still consent to allowing EA to collect information about their computers.

Legal issues in Germany 
According to reports in German newspapers, the German version of Origin's EULA violates several German laws, mainly laws protecting consumers and users' privacy. According to Thomas Hoeren, a judge and professor for information, telecommunication and media law at the University of Münster, the German version of the EULA is a direct translation of the original without any modifications and its clauses are "null and void".

Reception
In 2012, Nathan Grayson of Rock Paper Shotgun said that "[..] beyond being a branded storefront, I still don't understand what larger purpose Origin serves. In truth, I'd actually like to see it, er, pick up some steam, because I don't think it's healthy for Valve to not have a viable rival in this space. But this - at least, so far - isn't the way to do it. Origin's neither sprinted to the point of being neck-and-neck with Steam nor has it differentiated itself in any meaningful way. Instead, it's just puttered along at its own languid pace, harmlessly reminding us of its existence every time we pop open a big-name EA game."

Joshua Wolens of PC Gamer said that "Have you ever launched a game from Steam, only to watch Origin or UPlay spark to life, and thought "Ah, yes, how pleased I am to see you"? Of course you haven't, unless you own EA or Ubisoft stock. These things don't exist to make games better, they exist to give business liches and C-suite types a little warm glow."

In 2022, Alice O'Connor of Rock Paper Shotgun called Origin "much-maligned" and "inconvenience you must accept to play the EA games which require it, and beyond that it is useless." The login system was criticized for not remembering the login information and logging the user out repeatedly.

References

External links

 

2011 software
Android (operating system) software
Cloud gaming
Digital rights management systems
Digital rights management for macOS
Digital rights management for Windows
Electronic Arts
IOS software
Multiplayer video game services
Online-only retailers of video games
Proprietary software that uses Qt
Software that uses Qt
Defunct American websites